Spaelotis suecica is a moth belonging to the family Noctuidae. The species was first described by Per Olof Christopher Aurivillius in 1891.

It is native to Eurasia.

References

Noctuinae